Darantasia semiclusa is a moth of the family Erebidae first described by Francis Walker in 1865. It is found in Seram in Indonesia.

References

Nudariina
Moths described in 1865